Cutright may refer to:

 Jane Cutright, editor of The Petersburg Observer in Petersburg, Illinois
 Paul Russell Cutright (March 18, 1897 – March 11, 1988), American historian and biologist
 Simon Cutright (b. July 20, 1974), aka Simon Rex, American actor and rapper.

Jay Cutright of Cutright Precision Rifles world class rifle Smith and expert long range marksman.
Rifle builder for several competitive long range marksmen who have set numerous national and international records and won multiple championships in registered competition.